George Verity may refer to:

 George Matthew Verity (1865–1942), founder and first president of the American Rolling Mill Company (ARMCO)
 George M. Verity (towboat) (1927), American towboat
 George Douglas Verity (1933–2012), English cricketer, mountain climber, hotelier, and golfer